Buk District (literally north district) is a gu, or district, in north central Ulsan, South Korea. Its name literally means "North Ward". It stretches roughly from the Ring Road to Mohwa into the north and out to the coast in the east.

Demographics
149,676 people live in Ulsan Buk Gu's 80.41 km2. 77,214 of these are Korean males, 71,183 are Korean females, 961 are foreign males and 318 are foreign females (2006).  In no "dong" (smaller division) do women outnumber men.

Administrative divisions
The "Dong" of Buk-Gu are:
Changpyeong Dong (Hangul: 창평동)
Cheongok Dong (Hangul: 천곡동)
Daean Dong (Hangul: 대안동)
Dalcheon Dong (Hangul: 달천동)
Dangsa Dong (Hangul: 당사동)
Eomul Dong (Hangul: 어물동)
Gadae Dong (Hangul: 가대동)
Guyu Dong (Hangul: 구유동)
Hogye Dong (Hangul: 호계동)
Hwabong Dong (Hangul: 화봉동)
Hyomun Dong (Hangul: 효문동)
Jeongja Dong (Hangul: 정자동)
Jinjang Dong (Hangul: 진장동)
Jungsan Dong (Hangul: 중산동)
Maegok Dong (Hangul: 매곡동)
Muryong Dong (Hangul: 무룡동)
Myeongchon Dong (Hangul: 명촌동)
Sanha Dong (Hangul: 산하동)
Sinhyeon Dong (Hangul: 신현동)
Sinjeon Dong (Hangul: 신전동)
Sinmyeong Dong (Hangul: 신명동)
Sangan Dong (Hangul: 상안동)
Sirae Dong (Hangul: 시래동)
Songjeong Dong (Hangul: 송정동)
Yangjeong Dong (Hangul: 양정동)
Yeompo Dong (Hangul: 염포동)
Yeonam Dong (Hangul: 연암동)

Local attractions
 Jeongja Beach (정자 해수욕장)
Jeongja Beach (정자 해수욕장) is the most popular in Ulsan and there are several raw fish restaurants and pleasant western restaurants-come-bars lining the coast road around here. Most people in Ulsan go here infrequently, however, as it lies at the other end of a twisted road over the hills just south of Muryongsan (무룡산), Ulsan's second-highest hill.
 Jujeon Mongdol beach (주전몽돌해변)
Jujeon Mongdol beach (주전몽돌해변) is a beach that connects Jujeon (주전) and Gangdong (강동) and its length is about 1.5 km. It was also selected as one of the "12 must-see natural sights of Ulsan2 by Ulsan Metropolitan Government. Different from most beaches that are covered with sand, Junjeon Mongdol beach is covered with smooth pebble stones. Especially the seaside course that connects Jujeon (주전)-Jengja (정자)-Gangdong (강동) is well known for the best drive course of Ulsan.

Transport
Transport in Buk-gu is simple, as most of the population are in striking distance of either the Ring Road or National Road 7, which is the main road up the East Coast of South Korea and which, at this point, connects Ulsan with Gyeongju to the north. Ulsan's domestic airport (IATA Code: USN), which serves Seoul is located in Buk-gu.

Sister cities
Nokwon-gu

See also
List of districts in South Korea
Buk-gu, Ulsan (South Korea electorate)

References

External links
Everything you need to know about Ulsan 
Official site 
Official site